The Men’s Doubles tournament of the 2006 BCR Open Romania tennis championship took place in Bucharest, Romania, between 11 and 17 September 2006. 16 pairs from 13 countries competed in the 4-round tournament.

José Acasuso and Sebastián Prieto were the defending champions, but Acasuso opted to rest in order to compete at the Davis Cup the following week. Prieto teamed up with František Čermák and lost in the quarterfinals to Martín García and Luis Horna.

Mariusz Fyrstenberg and Marcin Matkowski won the title by defeating García and Horna 6–7(5–7), 7–6(7–5), [10–8] in the final.

Seeds

Draw

Draw

References

External links
 Main draw (ATP)
 ITF tournament profile

Romanian Open
2006 in Romanian tennis